Thelymitra cucullata, commonly called the swamp sun orchid, is a species of orchid that is endemic to the south-west of Western Australia. It has a single narrow leaf and up to ten small, greenish cream-coloured to white flowers with purple blotches and which quickly droop after they have been fertilised.

Description
The dorsal (top) sepal is wider and the labellum (the lowest petal) is narrower than the other sepals and petals. The column is a similar colour to the sepals and petals but with rows of purple spots. The flowers are self-pollinated, short-lived, open on sunny days and quickly droop after they have been fertilised. Flowering occurs in October and November.

Taxonomy and naming
Thelymitra cucullata was first formally described in 1946 by Herman Rupp from a specimen collected in the Stirling Range and the description was published in Australian Orchid Review. The specific epithet (cucullata) is a Latin word meaning "hooded", referring to the dorsal sepal which forms a hood over the column.

Distribution and habitat
The swamp sun orchid grows in winter-wet areas, around the edges of swamps and in shallow soil on granite outcrops. It is found between Perth and Israelite Bay.

Conservation
Thelymitra cucullata is classified as "not threatened" in Western Australia by the Western Australian Government Department of Parks and Wildlife.

References

External links
 
 

cucullata
Endemic orchids of Australia
Orchids of Western Australia
Plants described in 1946
Taxa named by Herman Rupp